In molecular biology the FGGY carbohydrate kinase family is a family of evolutionarily related carbohydrate kinase enzymes. These enzymes include L-fuculokinase  (gene fucK); gluconokinase  (gene gntK); glycerol kinase  (gene glpK); xylulokinase  (gene xylB); D-ribulose kinase  (gene FGGY/YDR109c); and L-xylulose kinase  (gene lyxK). These enzymes are proteins of from 480 to 520 amino acid residues.

These enzymes consist of two domains. The N-terminal and C-terminal domains both adopt a ribonuclease H-like fold and are structurally related to each other.

References

Protein domains